Kennedy Town is at the western end of Sai Wan on Hong Kong Island in Hong Kong. It was named after Arthur Edward Kennedy, the 7th Governor of Hong Kong from 1872 to 1877. Administratively, it is part of Central and Western District.

Due to its distance from major commercial cores and longtime inaccessibility by train, town development was less vigorous than in other parts of urban Hong Kong. But since the MTR was extended to the area in 2014, it is rapidly gentrifying, with many older businesses, such as vehicle repair workshops and cha chaan tengs, making way for new luxury developments, as well as high-end bars and restaurants.

Geography
Kennedy Town occupies the northwestern part of Hong Kong Island. It is bordered by the Belcher Bay of Victoria Harbour to the north, by Sulphur Channel to the west, Shek Tong Tsui to the east and Mount Davis and Lung Fu Shan to the south.

Historically, the district's western limit was legally defined as the western boundary of the City of Victoria. However, post-war development south of the boundary – Kennedy Town Service Reservoir Playground, Shun Hing College, Smithfield Garden, Mei Wah Mansion, Wah Fai House, and west of the boundary – Serene Court, The Sail at Victoria, and Island West Transfer Station, are all widely considered part of Kennedy Town. Kennedy Town Service Reservoir Playground, Lap Chee College of Shun Hing College, Block A of Smithfield Garden, Wah Fai House, and Serene Court straddle the boundary of Victoria. Since the borders of Kennedy Town have not officially been redefined, the above properties are technically either partly or entirely outside of Kennedy Town. The eastern boundary was not de jure defined but nevertheless de facto formerly defined as the alley between Belcher Court and Nam Hung Mansion. The border is also evidenced by the bend in the street grid, of which the alley is the axis. Due to the lack of space to relocate the Kennedy Town Swimming Pool for the Kennedy Town station, it had to be moved to Shek Tong Tsui. As a result, the border was de facto redefined as Collinson Street. Phase I of the Kennedy Town Swimming Pool is in Kennedy Town while Phase II is in Shek Tong Tsui. The elderly home in front of The Belcher's, Jockey Club Student Village I, and the Centennial Campus are in Kennedy Town, while The Belcher's itself and the part of The University of Hong Kong from the Chow Yei Ching Building to The Kadoorie Biological Sciences Building are in Shek Tong Tsui.

In 1886, when Arthur Edward Kennedy was governor, land was reclaimed along the coast of Kennedy Town. It formed a narrow coastal strip of land that included the Kennedy Praya and the coastal area from Beach Street via Collinson Street to Shek Tong Tsui. Additional land was reclaimed along the coast of Kennedy Town between 1933 and 1939, but works were suspended before the Battle of Hong Kong in 1941. Further reclamation was conducted at the end of the 20th century.

For district council elections purposes, the area roughly corresponds to the "Kennedy Town and Mount Davis", "Kwun Lung" and "Sai Wan" constituencies. The boundaries of such constituencies may be subject to modification.

History
Kennedy Town is the western section of the historical Victoria City. In 1903, the Hong Kong Government erected seven boundary stones for the city, inscribed "City Boundary 1903". One of them is located next to the Kennedy Town Temporary Recreation Ground at Sai Ning Street.

Features

Streets
Streets in Kennedy Town include:

 Belcher's Street
 Catchick Street. Named after Sir Catchick Paul Chater, it was named "Chater Street" until 1909, and was renamed to avoid confusion with the street in Central.
 Davis Street
 Forbes Street
 Hau Wo Street
 Ka Wai Man Road
 Kennedy Town Praya
 New Praya, Kennedy Town
 North Street
 Pokfield Road
 Smithfield
 Victoria Road

Housing

Two of the earliest public housing estates of Hong Kong are located in Kennedy Town: Sai Wan Estate, completed in 1958, and Kwun Lung Lau, built in 1967. More recent luxury residential developments include, The Merton, completed in 2005, which is a high-rise private housing development in the area, as well as Manhattan Heights completed in the year 2000. There are approximately 138 developments in the area.

Following the new MTR extension, new land for potential property developments in the district is in high demand. In a District Council meeting concerning the development of west Kennedy Town in March 2015, the proposed rezoning plan gained general support despite some expressing their worries about the community's carrying capacity. Outlined areas to be rezoned and redeveloped include the ex-Mount Davis cottage area on Victoria Road, the Hong Kong Academy temporary campus and former Police Married Officers Quarters on Ka Wai Man Road, as well as the ex-Kennedy Town Incinerator and Abattoir site on Cadogan Street. The project is expected to provide about 3,000 public and private residential units. For the long-discussed redevelopment project regarding the district's half-century-old buildings, the Housing Authority admitted they have no plans to implement it after considering the costs and effects to rebuild and relocate, which will foreseeably increase the public housing burden.

Historic buildings

Historic buildings and places in Kennedy Town include:
 Lo Pan Temple, a Grade I historic building
 Elliot Pumping Station & Filters Senior Staff Quarters, No. 77 Pok Fu Lam Road, a Grade II historic building
 Elliot Pumping Station & Filters Workmen's Quarters, a Grade III historic building
 Elliot Pumping Station & Filters, Treatment Works Building, a Grade III historic building
 Ex-Western Fire Station, No. 12 Belcher's Street, a Grade III historic building. Converted into the Po Leung Kuk Chan Au Big Yan Home for the Elderly.

Facilities

 Smithfield Municipal Services Building, located at 12K Smithfield, at the corner with Rock Hill Street
 Kennedy Town Community Complex, located at 12 Rock Hill Street, adjacent to Smithfield Municipal Services Building. The 16-storey building was completed in May 2006 and won a Certificate of Merit in the 2006 Design Award Scheme
 Kennedy Town Swimming Pool, located at 2 Sai Cheung Street North, next to Belcher Bay Park. It opened on 11 May 2011, replacing the swimming pool at Smithfield, demolished to facilitate the construction of Kennedy Town station.
 Cadogan Street Temporary Garden.
 Kennedy Town Fire Station, located at the northern end of Smithfield, at the corner with New Praya.
 Victoria Public Mortuary, located at 34 Victoria Road.

Parks
 Belcher Bay Park
 Cadogan Street Temporary Park
 Forbes Street Temporary Playground
 Instagram Pier
 Kennedy Town Temporary Recreation Ground at Sai Ning Street

Demographics
The neighbourhood is primarily Chinese, but a growing number of expats are moving into a number of luxury buildings built along the waterfront.

Transport

The western terminus of the Hong Kong Tramways is located in Kennedy Town next to The Merton in Catchick Street.

Kennedy Town is also served by Kennedy Town station, opened in 2014 as part of an extension of the Island line of the Mass Transit Railway (MTR).

Education
Kennedy Town is in Primary One Admission (POA) School Net 11.

References

External links

 Pang, Yee-han, "Urban revitalization of Kennedy Town", University of Hong Kong, 1996

 
Populated places in Hong Kong
Central and Western District, Hong Kong